Dyshypostena tarsalis is a species of tachinid flies in the genus Dyshypostena of the family Tachinidae.

Distribution
Congo, Ghana, Tanzania, Zimbabwe

External links

Tachinidae
Insects described in 1939
Taxa named by Joseph Villeneuve de Janti
Diptera of Africa